Joanna (Balladyna) Troikowicz born 1952 in Kraków, is a Polish-Swedish sculptor, designer and painter. Since 1977 she has lived and worked in Sweden.

Education

 1967 - 72 - LSP - College of Fine Arts, B.A, Cracow, -title technician decorator, extra diploma in Sculpture
 1972 - 77 - Akademia Sztuk Pieknych - Academy of Fine Arts, Cracow, Sculpture, studio prof. M. Konieczny, Diploma- M.A
 1975 - 77 - Studium pedagog. przy ASP, Teachers Training College for Artists, Cracow
 1977 – 80 - Royal Academy of Fine Arts, Stockholm, Sculpture

Awards
 Winner of the Grand Prix, of the Fédération Internationale de la Médaille d'Art (FIDEM), 1998, Haag, Holand,
 Innovation Prize- 1st International Biennale of Contemporary Medal of Seixal, Portugal, 1999,
 “Selezioni di Merito”- XIV Biennale Internatzionale Dantesca “Dante Europeo”, Ravenna, Italy, 2003,

Teaching
 Royal Academy of Fine Arts, project assistant, research in concrete, manager of a stone cutting project at Broby, Skåne, plaster workshop -supply teacher 1981–83, curses in concrete, Employed at the Royal Academy of Fine Arts 1980 – 85
 Art School in Örebro, sculpture, drawing, April, May, 1985, Feb.1998, Sept.1999
 Art College- Konstfackskolan, course in concrete- Nov. 1986 course in patina plaster, and concrete March- Dec.1987
 Art School “Forum”, Malmö, 1987- 1991
 Teacher at the International Symposium of Medal Art- Kankaanpää, Finland, May 1999
 Teacher at the Royal Institute of Technology (KTH), architecture, construction- Feb. 2000
 Teacher at Art School (Folhögskolan), Åland, 2001, 2002

Public Commissions
 Sculpture in the park, Ostrowiec, Poland 1974
 Sculpture for Military Hospital, Cracow 1975
 Entrance to Spånga Health Centre 1985
 Two entrances in buildings, Södermalm, Stockholm 1986, 1987
 Yard in Södermalm, Stockholm 1987
 Decoration –wall for the Metro Station “Globen”(competition) 1988, made 1989
 Entrance to Solna Health Centre 1990
 “Rydaholm’s Ell”, sculpture for Rydaholm, Värnamo Municipality 1991
 Five sculptures “Playing Cards” for Älvsjöbadet, Stockholm, 1991, made 1992
 Sculpture “The Anchor” for Hanninge Hospital 1994
 “The Realm of the See”, reliefs in marble of nine entrances at Hammarby's new housing estate, Stockholm, 1994, made 1995

Represented:Art Medal World Congress. Congresso Mundial De Medalhistica FIDEM XXIX 2004, Seixal, Portugal -catalogue for International exhibition.
 Muzeum Sztuki Medalierskiej, The Modern Museum of Medals, Wroclaw, Poland, 1979
 Stockholm Municipality, Stockholm's City Council
 Örebro City Council, The County Art Council's
 Kungl. Myntkabinettet, (The Royal Coin Cabinet), Stockholm
 The British Museum (Department of Coins and Medals), London, Great Britain
 Museum Minci a Medali, Kremnica, Slovakia, 2000

Private Collections
Poland, Sweden, Finland, Japan, France, Italy, Slovakia, USA,

References

1955 births
Living people
Modern sculptors
Polish sculptors
Swedish women sculptors
20th-century Polish women artists
21st-century Polish women artists
20th-century Swedish women artists
21st-century Swedish women artists